Ma Li may refer to:

Ma Li (politician) (1916–1979), Chinese politician
Ma Li (footballer) (born 1969), Chinese female footballer
Ma Li (artist) (born 1982), Chinese artist
Ma Li (actress) (born 1982), Chinese actress
Ma Li (actor) (born 1995), Chinese actor
Ma Lik (1952–2007), or Ma Li, Hong Kong politician

See also
Mali (disambiguation)